John Beverley (fl. 1414), of Cambridge, was an English politician.

He was a Member (MP) of the Parliament of England for Cambridge in April 1414.

References

14th-century births
15th-century deaths
People from Cambridge
English MPs April 1414